Gunilla Elisabeth Andersson (born 17 December 1955) is a retired Swedish swimmer who won two bronze medals at the 1974 European Aquatics Championships. She also competed in three butterfly and medley relay events at the 1976 Summer Olympics, but was eliminated in preliminaries.

References

1955 births
Swimmers at the 1976 Summer Olympics
Swedish female butterfly swimmers
Living people
Olympic swimmers of Sweden
European Aquatics Championships medalists in swimming
SK Neptun swimmers
Swimmers from Stockholm